Aaron James Scott (born 18 July 1986) is a New Zealand footballer who plays for NZFC side Waitakere United and has represented New Zealand under 23 at the Olympics and played for the senior side, the All Whites.

International career
He was included in the New Zealand squad for the football tournament at the Summer Olympics in Beijing where he played in  all three of New Zealand's group matches against China (1-1), Brazil (0-5) and Belgium (0-1). Scott has been included in the New Zealand squad for the 2009 FIFA Confederations Cup in South Africa, along with fellow non-professionals James Bannatyne and Andrew Barron.

Scott made his full All Whites debut as a substitute in a 1–3 loss to Thailand on 28 March 2009.

International goals and caps
New Zealand's goal tally first.

International career statistics

Club career statistics

References

External links

1986 births
Living people
New Zealand association footballers
Sportspeople from Hamilton, New Zealand
Olympic association footballers of New Zealand
New Zealand international footballers
Waikato FC players
Waitakere United players
People educated at Hamilton Boys' High School
Association football defenders
2008 OFC Nations Cup players
Footballers at the 2008 Summer Olympics
2009 FIFA Confederations Cup players